The United States Post Office and Federal Building is a post office building in La Grande, Oregon. It is listed on the National Register of Historic Places. It now functions as the La Grande city hall.

See also
 List of United States post offices
 National Register of Historic Places listings in Union County, Oregon

References

Federal buildings in the United States
1913 establishments in Oregon
Government buildings completed in 1913
City and town halls on the National Register of Historic Places in Oregon
Colonial Revival architecture in Oregon
La Grande, Oregon
National Register of Historic Places in Union County, Oregon
Post office buildings on the National Register of Historic Places in Oregon